The following television stations operate on virtual channel 17 in the United States:

 K14TG-D in Monterey, California
 K16IS-D in Pittsburg, Kansas
 K16JS-D in Eugene, Oregon
 K17BV-D in Redwood Falls, Minnesota
 K17DL-D in Branson, Missouri
 K17DU-D in Christmas Valley, Oregon
 K17ED-D in Payette, Idaho
 K17GD-D in Paso Robles, California
 K17GE-D in Dove Creek, etc., Colorado
 K17GJ-D in Twentynine Palms, California
 K17HI-D in Amarillo, Texas
 K17JJ-D in Cortez, Colorado
 K17JN-D in Enid, Oklahoma
 K17KW-D in Gettysburg, South Dakota
 K17LM-D in Yuma, Arizona
 K17LP-D in Fruitland, New Mexico
 K17LV-D in Paragould, Arkansas
 K17MP-D in Midland, Texas
 K17MS-D in Poplar, Montana
 K17MW-D in St. James, Minnesota
 K17OV-D in Duluth, Minnesota
 K17OW-D in Hobbs, New Mexico
 K17OY-D in Centerville, Washington
 K17PA-D in Mullan, Idaho
 K18NT-D in Grand Forks, North Dakota
 K26OH-D in Roseau, Minnesota
 K47OQ-D in Alexandria, Minnesota
 KAAS-LP in Garden City, Kansas
 KABH-CD in Bend, Oregon
 KBMY in Bismarck, North Dakota
 KBNT-CD in San Diego, California
 KDOR-TV in Bartlesville, Oklahoma
 KDSM-TV in Des Moines, Iowa
 KEEN-CD in Las Vegas, Nevada
 KGET-TV in Bakersfield, California
 KHAX-LD in Vista, California
 KIDU-LD in Brownwood, Texas
 KLDF-CD in Lompoc, California
 KMIZ in Columbia, Missouri
 KMOL-LD in Victoria, Texas
 KMPH-CD in Merced-Mariposa, California
 KMWE-LD in Saint Cloud, Minnesota
 KNIC-DT in Blanco, Texas
 KOCW in Hoisington, Kansas
 KODG-LD in Palm Springs, California
 KOOH-LD in Helena, Montana
 KPCB-DT in Snyder, Texas
 KSAS-LP in Dodge City, Kansas
 KSBB-CD in Santa Barbara, California
 KSWL-LD in Lake Charles, Louisiana
 KVAT-LD in Austin, Texas
 KVDO-LD in Albany, Oregon
 KWVT-LD in Salem, Oregon
 KXVU-LD in Chico, California
 KYTL-LD in Twin Falls, Idaho
 W09CZ-D in Roslyn, New York
 W17CT-D in Manteo, North Carolina
 W17DL-D in Toa Baja, Puerto Rico
 W17DO-D in Wilmington, North Carolina
 W17EH-D in Quincy, Illinois
 W17EI-D in Jackson, Tennessee
 W17ES-D in Adel, Georgia
 W18ER-D in Muskegon, Michigan
 W20EW-D in Augusta, Georgia
 W22FB-D in Marion, North Carolina
 W23EQ-D in Danville, Illinois
 W23ER-D in Poughkeepsie, New York
 W29ES-D in Jacksonville, Illinois
 W29EY-D in Columbia, Mississippi
 W29FE-D in Bat Cave, etc., North Carolina
 W36FA-D in Hesperia, Michigan
 WALE-LD in Montgomery, Alabama
 WAND (TV) in Decatur, Illinois
 WBZM-LD in Wilkes-Barre, Pennsylvania
 WCWJ in Jacksonville, Florida
 WDBB in Bessemer, Alabama
 WDEM-CD in Columbus, Ohio
 WDLI-TV in Canton, Ohio
 WEWA-LD in Wewahitchka, Florida
 WFFC-LD in Midland, Michigan
 WIIH-CD in Indianapolis, Indiana
 WKTD-CD in Portsmouth, Virginia
 WLIG-LD in Plainview, etc., New York, on virtual channel 17
 WLRN-TV in Miami, Florida
 WMAU-TV in Bude, Mississippi
 WMHT in Schenectady, New York
 WNCN in Goldsboro, North Carolina
 WNDT-CD in Manhattan, New York
 WNED-TV in Buffalo, New York
 WPCH-TV in Atlanta, Georgia
 WPHL-TV in Philadelphia, Pennsylvania
 WQFT-LD in Ocala, Florida
 WRLW-CD in Salem, Indiana
 WTVO in Rockford, Illinois
 WUNE-TV in Linville, North Carolina
 WVMA-CD in Winchendon, Massachusetts
 WVXF in Charlotte Amalie, U.S. Virgin Islands
 WWOO-LD in Westmoreland, New Hampshire
 WXMI in Grand Rapids, Michigan
 WXVT-LD in Cleveland, Mississippi
 WZTV in Nashville, Tennessee

The following television stations, which are no longer licensed, formerly operated on virtual channel 17 in the United States:
 K12QZ-D in San Luis Obispo, California
 K17AF-D in Delta Junction, Alaska
 KGLU-LD in Ottumwa, Iowa
 KHJL-LD in Rapid City, South Dakota
 KJRW in Eureka, California
 KNTS-LP in Natchitoches, Louisiana
 W42AX-D in Bakersville, North Carolina
 WBKH-LD in Port Charlotte, Florida
 WDYI-LD in Macon, Georgia
 WPGF-LD in Memphis, Tennessee

References

17 virtual